According to traditional Chinese uranography, the modern constellation Monoceros is located within the southern quadrant of the sky, which is symbolized as the Vermillion Bird of the South (南方朱雀, Nán Fāng Zhū Què).

The name of the western constellation in modern Chinese is 麒麟座 (qí lín zuò), meaning "the qilin constellation".

Stars
The map of Chinese constellation in constellation Monoceros area consists of :

See also
Traditional Chinese star names
Chinese constellations

References

External links
Monoceros – Chinese associations

Astronomy in China
Monoceros (constellation)